The Netherlands competed at the 2004 Summer Olympics in Athens, Greece, from 13 to 29 August 2004. Dutch athletes have competed in every Summer Olympic games since its official debut in 1908. Netherlands, however, boycotted the 1956 Summer Olympics in Melbourne, because of the Soviet invasion of Hungary. The Netherlands National Olympic Committee (NOC*NSF) sent a total of 210 athletes to the Games, 134 men and 76 women, to compete in 21 sports. Baseball, field hockey, and men's volleyball were the only team-based sports in which the Netherlands had its representation at these Games. There was only a single competitor in women's fencing.

The Dutch team featured five defending Olympic champions: swimming stars Pieter van den Hoogenband and Inge de Bruijn, road and track cyclist Leontien van Moorsel, dressage rider Anky van Grunsven along with her horse Bonfire, and middleweight judoka Mark Huizinga, who later became the Netherlands' flag bearer in the opening ceremony. Star sailor Mark Neeleman, at age 45, became the first Dutch male athlete to compete in six Olympic Games since 1980 (except the 1988 Summer Olympics, in which he was selected). Shooter Hennie Dompeling sought his fifth Olympic bid as one of the most sophisticated members of the team, having missed the medal podium in the men's skeet from Sydney four years earlier. Among the Dutch athletes of the team, several of them were born outside the Netherlands and became naturalized citizens, including sprinter Troy Douglas, who competed for three Olympics under the Bermudian flag, badminton players Mia Audina from Indonesia and Jie Yao from China, and taekwondo jin Charmie Sobers from the Netherlands Antilles.

Netherlands left Athens with a total of 22 Olympic medals, 4 golds, 9 silver, and 9 bronze, failing to achieve three medals short of the record from Sydney. Four Olympic champions managed to defend their titles from the previous Games in their respective events, while van den Hoogenband, de Bruijn, and van Moorsel still emerged as the most decorated Dutch athletes at these Games for the second time with more than a single medal. Seven of these medals were awarded to the athletes in swimming, including two from the freestyle relay teams; four each in cycling and judo, and three in rowing. Netherlands' team-based athletes proved particularly successful in Athens, as the men's and women's field hockey teams took home silver medals.

Medalists

|  style="text-align:left; width:72%; vertical-align:top;"|

| style="text-align:left; width:23%; vertical-align:top;"|

Archery

Three Dutch archers qualified each for the men's individual archery, and a spot for the men's team.

Athletics

Dutch athletes have so far achieved qualifying standards in the following athletics events (up to a maximum of 3 athletes in each event at the 'A' Standard, and 1 at the 'B' Standard).

Men
Track & road events

Field events

Combined events – Decathlon

Women
Track & road events

Field events

Combined events – Heptathlon

Badminton

Baseball

Roster
Manager: 6 - Robert Eenhoorn

Coaches: 17 - Eric de Bruin, 30 - Davey Johnson, 32 - Hensley Meulens

Round robin

Canoeing

Slalom

Cycling

Road
Men

Women

Track
Sprint

Pursuit

Time trial

Keirin

Omnium

Mountain biking

Equestrian

Because only three horse and rider pairs from each nation could advance beyond certain rounds in the individual events, five American pairs did not advance despite being placed sufficiently high.  They received rankings below all pairs that did advance.

Dressage

Show jumping

Fencing

Women

Field hockey

Men's tournament

Roster

Group play

Semifinals

Gold medal match

Women's tournament

Roster

Group play

Semifinals

Gold medal match

Gymnastics

Artistic
Women

Trampoline

Judo

Seven Dutch judoka (four men and three women) qualified for the 2004 Summer Olympics.

Men

Women

Rowing

Dutch rowers qualified the following boats:

Men

Women

Qualification Legend: FA=Final A (medal); FB=Final B (non-medal); FC=Final C (non-medal); FD=Final D (non-medal); FE=Final E (non-medal); FF=Final F (non-medal); SA/B=Semifinals A/B; SC/D=Semifinals C/D; SE/F=Semifinals E/F; R=Repechage

Sailing

Dutch sailors have qualified one boat for each of the following events.

Men

Women

Open

M = Medal race; OCS = On course side of the starting line; DSQ = Disqualified; DNF = Did not finish; DNS= Did not start; RDG = Redress given

Shooting

Three Dutch shooters qualified to compete in the following events:

Men

Swimming

Dutch swimmers earned qualifying standards in the following events (up to a maximum of 2 swimmers in each event at the A-standard time, and 1 at the B-standard time):

Men

* Competed only in heats and received medals

Women

* Competed only in heats and received medals

Synchronized swimming

Two Dutch synchronized swimmers qualified a spot in the women's duet.

Table tennis

Two Dutch table tennis players qualified for the following events.

Taekwondo

Two Dutch taekwondo jin qualified for the following events.

Triathlon

Two Dutch triathletes qualified for the following events.

Volleyball

Beach

Indoor

Men's tournament

Roster

Group play

See also
 Netherlands at the 2004 Summer Paralympics

References

External links
Official Report of the XXVIII Olympiad
NOC*NSF 

Nations at the 2004 Summer Olympics
2004
Summer Olympics